Wabaunsee County (standard abbreviation: WB) is a county located in the U.S. state of Kansas. As of the 2020 census, the county population was 6,877. Its county seat is Alma. The county was created by the territorial legislature of Kansas Territory on March 25, 1859, and was named for a chief of the Potawatomi Indians.

History

19th century

For millennia, the land now known as Kansas was inhabited by Native Americans. In 1803, most of modern Kansas was secured by the United States as part of the Louisiana Purchase. The first white settlers in the area were said to have been a band of outlaws known as the McDaniel Gang.

In 1854, the Kansas Territory was organized and Wabaunsee County was created by the territorial legislature on March 25, 1859. The name used since 1859 is derived from the Potawatomi "Wah-bon-seh", meaning "dawn of day" literally, and it was the name of the chief of the Potawatomi Indians. Originally, the county was named Richardson, after William Alexander Richardson, a congressman from Illinois, who introduced the first Kansas and Nebraska Bill in the House of Representatives, which made certain Indian lands territories in 1854.

Also in 1854, the Beecher Bible and Rifle Church was established by a group of free-staters, who had rifles shipped to the church to be used in the free-state effort in boxes marked Bibles. Captain William Mitchell, Jr., a seaman who joined the Beecher Bible and Rifle Colony that settled in Wabaunsee, played an important role in the county settlement and with the underground railroad.

The county's first church, Wabaunsee Church of Christ, was founded in June 1857.

In 1861 Kansas became the 34th U.S. state, entering the union as a free state.

The first railroad to be built through Wabaunsee County was the Atchison, Topeka, and Santa Fe in 1880. In 1887, the Chicago, Kansas and Nebraska Railway built a main line from Topeka to Herington.  This main line connected Topeka, Valencia, Willard, Maple Hill, Vera, Paxico, McFarland, Alma, Volland, Alta Vista, Dwight, White City, Latimer, Herington.

20th century
A massive drought beginning in 1930 resulted in a series of dust storms that lasted until 1941. The drought combined with the onset of the Great Depression, forced farmers off the land. This ecological disaster caused an exodus of many farmers to escape from the hostile environment of Kansas. As the world demand for wheat plummeted, rural Kansas became poverty-stricken. The state became an eager participant in such major New Deal relief programs as the Civil Works Administration, the Federal Emergency Relief Administration, the Civilian Conservation Corps, the Works Progress Administration, which put tens of thousands of Kansans to work as unskilled labor. Republican Governor Alf Landon also employed emergency measures, including a moratorium on mortgage foreclosures and a balanced budget initiative. The Agricultural Adjustment Administration succeeded in raising wheat prices after 1933, thus alleviating the most serious distress.

During World War II, the U.S. Army located a German prisoner of war camp at Lake Wabaunsee, near Eskridge. It was believed that the prisoners would be less of a security risk in North America, where there were fewer Nazi sympathizers, than they would be in Europe. The prisoners were paid $0.40 per hour and granted a daily noon lunch, in exchange for their help on farms and bridges throughout the region.

Geography

Adjacent counties
 Pottawatomie County (north)
 Shawnee County (east)
 Osage County (southeast)
 Lyon County (south)
 Morris County (southwest)
 Geary County (west)
 Riley County (northwest)

Demographics

Wabaunsee County is part of the Topeka, KS Metropolitan Statistical Area.

As of the census of 2000, there were 6,885 people, 2,633 households, and 1,958 families residing in the county.  The population density was 9 people per square mile (3/km2).  There were 3,033 housing units at an average density of 4 per square mile (1/km2).  The racial makeup of the county was 97.24% White, 0.46% Black or African American, 0.49% Native American, 0.15% Asian, 0.06% Pacific Islander, 0.60% from other races, and 1.00% from two or more races.  1.86% of the population were Hispanic or Latino of any race.

There were 2,633 households, out of which 33.50% had children under the age of 18 living with them, 64.30% were married couples living together, 6.30% had a female householder with no husband present, and 25.60% were non-families. 23.00% of all households were made up of individuals, and 10.80% had someone living alone who was 65 years of age or older.  The average household size was 2.57 and the average family size was 3.01.

In the county, the population was spread out, with 26.70% under the age of 18, 6.20% from 18 to 24, 26.70% from 25 to 44, 24.80% from 45 to 64, and 15.60% who were 65 years of age or older.  The median age was 40 years. For every 100 females, there were 102.50 males.  For every 100 females age 18 and over, there were 101.30 males.

The median income for a household in the county was $41,710, and the median income for a family was $47,500. Males had a median income of $31,629 versus $23,148 for females. The per capita income for the county was $17,704.  About 5.80% of families and 7.30% of the population were below the poverty line, including 8.40% of those under age 18 and 7.90% of those age 65 or over.

Government

Presidential elections

Wabaunsee County is overwhelmingly Republican. No Democratic presidential candidate has won Wabaunsee County since Franklin D. Roosevelt in 1932, and since at least 1888 only Roosevelt in 1932 and 1936, plus William Jennings Bryan in 1896, have reached 41 percent of the county's vote for the Democratic Party. The county was however one of three Kansas counties – Anderson and Jefferson being the other two – to give a plurality to Ross Perot in 1992.

Laws
Wabaunsee County was a prohibition, or "dry", county until the Kansas Constitution was amended in 1986 and voters approved the sale of alcoholic liquor by the individual drink with a 30 percent food sales requirement.

Education

Unified school districts
 Wamego USD 320
 Wabaunsee USD 329
 Mission Valley USD 330

Communities

Cities

 Alma
 Alta Vista
 Eskridge
 Harveyville
 Maple Hill
 McFarland
 Paxico
 St. Marys (part)
 Willard (part)

Unincorporated communities

 Keene
 Newbury
 Volland
 Wabaunsee
 Wilmington

Ghost town
 Bradford
 Vera

Townships
Wabaunsee County is divided into thirteen townships.  None of the cities within the county are considered governmentally independent, and all figures for the townships include those of the cities.  In the following table, the population center is the largest city (or cities) included in that township's population total, if it is of a significant size.

See also
 National Register of Historic Places listings in Wabaunsee County, Kansas

References

Further reading

 Early History of Wabaunsee County, Kansas; Matt Thomson; 376 pages; 1901.
 Standard Atlas of Wabaunsee County, Kansas; Geo. A. Ogle & Co; 76 pages; 1919.
 Standard Atlas of Wabaunsee County, Kansas; Geo. A. Ogle & Co; 47 pages; 1902.
 Atlas of Wabaunsee County, Kansas; Gillen & Davy; 51 pages; 1885.

External links

County
 
 Wabaunsee County - Directory of Public Officials
Historical
 Wabaunsee County GenWeb website
Maps
 Wabaunsee County Maps: Current, Historic, KDOT
 Kansas Highway Maps: Current, Historic, KDOT
 Kansas Railroad Maps: Current, 1996, 1915, KDOT and Kansas Historical Society

 
Kansas counties
Kansas placenames of Native American origin
1859 establishments in Kansas Territory
Topeka metropolitan area, Kansas